is an active stratovolcano in Fukushima prefecture, Japan.

It has a conical-shaped crater and as the name "Kofuji" (small Mount Fuji) suggests, the shape of Mount Azuma is like that of Mount Fuji. Mount Azuma's appealing symmetrical crater and the nearby fumarolic area with its many onsen have made it a popular tourist destination.

The Bandai-Azuma Skyline passes just below the crater, allowing visitors to drive to within walking distance of the crater and other various hiking trails on the mountain. There is also a visitor center along the roadway near the crater, where a collection of eateries, facilities, a parking lot, and a stop for buses from Fukushima Station are located.

The Azuma volcanic group contains several volcanic lakes, including Goshiki-numa, the 'Five Colored Lakes'.

Each Spring, as the snow melts away, a white rabbit appears on the side of Mount Azuma. The melting snow shaped like a rabbit is known as the 'seeding rabbit' and signals to the people of Fukushima that the farming season has come.

See also 
 List of volcanoes in Japan
 List of the 100 famous mountains in Japan

Notes

References

External links 
 
 Azumayama - Japan Meteorological Agency 
  - Japan Meteorological Agency
 Azuma Yama - Geological Survey of Japan
 Azumayama: Global Volcanism Program - Smithsonian Institution

Mountains of Fukushima Prefecture
Volcanoes of Honshū
Stratovolcanoes of Japan
Active volcanoes
Volcanic groups
Volcanoes of Fukushima Prefecture